The general speed limits in Namibia are (according to Road Authority of Namibia):

60 km/h on a public road within an urban area (may be lifted to 80 km/h on some major urban roads)
120 km/h on every tarmac freeway.
100 km/h on non-tarmac freeway ("gravel" road)

Namibia
Road transport in Namibia